Gołymin-Ośrodek  is a village in Ciechanów County, Masovian Voivodeship, in east-central Poland. It is the seat of the gmina (administrative district) called Gmina Gołymin-Ośrodek.

The village has a population of 700.

See also
Gołymin
Battle of Gołymin
Gołymin-Północ ("Gołymin North", a separate sołectwo)
Gołymin-Południe ("Gołymin South", a separate sołectwo)

References

Villages in Ciechanów County

es:Gogole Wielkie
nl:Gołymin-Ośrodek